Eswatini is an overwhelmingly Christian majority country, with adherents of Islam being a minuscule minority. Due to secular nature of the Eswatini's constitution, Muslims are free to proselytize and build places of worship in the country. 

The nation is home to over a million people, of which less than 1% identify as Muslim, most of whom belong to Sunni branch with a sizeable Ahmadiyya minority. Islam in Eswatini probably dates to the colonial period, when, as in Eswatini's much larger neighbor South Africa, many Muslims settled in the country from other countries under the dominion of the British Empire.

History
While Muslims settled in Eswatini during the colonial period, an active community emerged around the early 1960s when Malawian Muslims arrived in Eswanti to work in asbestos mines. A few locals converted and Malawi-Swazi communities formed in some small towns. Islam became a recognized religion in 1972 by the approval of Sobhuza II. Muslims since then have partaken in the national Good Friday festivities to pray for the well-being of the monarch and many Islamic institutions have been established in urban areas.

Population
According to the CIA World Factbook, only 2% of Eswatini's Christian-majority population are Muslim. The Muslim community in Eswatini comprises local Muslim (most of whom identify as Sunni Muslims) and refugees and immigrants from Asia and neighbouring African states. The Ahmadiyya Muslim Community claims 250 members in the country.

Law and politics
Muslim marriages in Eswatini are not included in the Marriage Act of 1964 which governs civil marriages. However, according to local imam Luqman Asooka, Muslim marriages are considered as custom marriages that are allowed in the constitution which guarantees "freedom of worship".

Mosques
 Ezulwini Mosque

See also
 Religion in Eswatini

References

External links
 Mbabane Islamic Centre 
 CIA Profile of religion in Eritrea